Richard Miranda may refer to:
 Richard Miranda (politician) (born 1956), Democratic member of the Arizona Senate
 Richard Garcia Miranda (born 1975), Brazilian football striker, commonly known as Miran